The Naval Corps was a corps formation of the German Empire in World War I.  It was formed in November 1914 and was still in existence at the end of the war.

Chronicle 
The Naval Corps was formed on 20 November 1914 to command the land-based forces of the Imperial German Navy operating in Flanders.  It was continuously based on the extreme right wing of the German line on the Western Front, up against the North Sea.  It commanded the 1st Naval Division and 2nd Naval Division also including 3rd Naval Division throughout; one division held the land front, the other the sea front.

It was still in existence at the end of the war in the 4th Army, Heeresgruppe Kronprinz Rupprecht on the Western Front, still holding the extreme right of the line.  It had the following composition:
 1st Naval Division
 2nd Naval Division
 two thirds 38th Landwehr Division
 one third 3rd Division
 85th Landwehr Division

Order of battle 
MarineKorps Flandern

– Admiral Ludwig von Schröder

1. Strength at the end of 1918:

1st MarineDivision

– 1st Marine-Brigade

1st Seabattalion

2nd Seabattalion

3rd Seabattalion

– 2nd Marine-Pionier-Battlion

– 1st Pioneer Kompanie

– 2nd Matrosen-Artillerie-Regiment

– 3rd Piooner Sturmtrupen Kompanie

2. Strength at the end of 1918:

– 3rd Marine-Brigade

– 1st Schwere Waffen Kompanie

– 2nd Schwere Waffen Kompanie

– 3rd Marine Regiment

– 1st Marine-Feldartilleriebatterie

– 4th Marine-Brigade

– 2nd Marine-Feldartilleriebatterie

– 4th Matrosen-Regiment

–3rd Marine-Pionier-Kompanie

3. Strength at creation on July 1, 1917

3rd MarineDivision

– Marine-Infanterie-Brigade

– 9th Feldartillerie-Regiment

– 1st Marine-Infanterie-Regiment

– 115th Pioniere-Batallion

– 2nd Marine-Infanterie-Regiment

– 1st Reserve-Kompagnie, 24th Marinebattalion

– 3rd Marine-Infanterie-Regiment

– 3rd Eskadron

– 160th Minenwerfer-Kompagnie

– 7th Husaren-Regiment

Commanders 
The Naval Corps was commanded throughout its existence by Admiral Ludwig von Schröder, brought out of retirement.

See also 

German Army (German Empire)
German Army order of battle, Western Front (1918)
63rd (Royal Naval) Division

References

Bibliography 

 
 
 

Corps of Germany in World War I
Military units and formations of the Imperial German Navy
Military units and formations established in 1914
Military units and formations disestablished in 1919